"Loca People" (also known as "Loca People (La Gente Está Muy Loca)" or "Loca People (What the Fuck!)") is a song by Spanish DJ and record producer Sak Noel. Dutch singer Esthera Sarita performed the female vocals in the song. It was released in Spain on 9 February 2011 by Blanco y Negro Records, while the same day, the music video was shot on YouTube; in Italy, it was released on 3 March 2011 by Do it Yourself Music Group, then in most countries, it was released on 24 June 2011, but was released in the United Kingdom on 25 September 2011. It subsequently debuted at number one on the UK Singles Chart on 2 October 2011, giving Sak Noel his first UK number one single.

Background
At a gig organised by Danish radio station The Voice, Noel explained the coincidence of how "Loca People" came about. "[Esthera Sarita] is the real singer behind the song 'Loca People'," he said. "She did the vocals one year ago in my studio and the story was very funny because I didn't know her, and one day she came to my studio, and I asked her 'do you mind singing some words in front of the mic?' so she did it. After that we didn’t meet again for the reasons of life, and she was working as a waitress in a club. After that, and after making the song and having it on YouTube and everything, we met through Facebook. And now we're working together and travelling around the world."

Critical reception
"Loca People" received mixed reception from music critics. Robert Copsey and Lewis Corner of Digital Spy were critical of the song, giving it one star of a possible five. In reference to the song's lyrics, the review read: "What the f**k?!" In contrast, Samantha McCallum of Maxumi Magazine provided a positive review of the track, stating it "will continue to carry the party on". "It seems as though the purpose of the song is to become a party ritual", McCallum commented. "If so, it works."

Music video
The music video was filmed by Roger Martin Solé and was directed by Sak Noel. It was filmed in Barcelona, Spain in the nightclub venue Millennium & Cosmic Club in Girona (within the Polynuclear Urban Region of Barcelona), and features Desirée Brihuega and Noel himself. Besides the club scene, there are also outdoor scenes where the general public take part in the video.

Track listing
Digital download
"Loca People (What the Fuck!)" (Radio Edit) (Explicit) – 3:36

US digital EP
"Loca People" (Radio Edit) – 3:35
"Loca People" (Original Mix) – 5:40

German CD single
"Loca People (What the Fuck!)" (Radio Edit) (Explicit)
"Loca People (What the Fuck!)" (Explicit)

UK digital download
"Loca People" (UK Radio Edit) – 2:13
"Loca People" (Original Mix) – 5:40
"Loca People" (Liam Keegan Radio Edit) – 2:54
"Loca People" (Liam Keegan Remix) – 5:26
"Loca People" (XNRG Mix) – 4:45

Charts and certifications

Weekly charts

Year-end charts

Certifications

Release history

CDM Chartbusters cover version
The same week Sak Noel's version made number one, a sound-alike version of "Loca People" by CDM Chartbusters made number 55.

See also
 List of Dutch Top 40 number-one singles of 2011
 List of number-one dance singles of 2011 (Poland)

References

External links
 

2011 singles
Sak Noel songs
English-language Spanish songs
Spanish-language songs
Dutch Top 40 number-one singles
Number-one singles in Austria
Number-one singles in Belgium
Number-one singles in Denmark
Number-one singles in Israel
Number-one singles in Russia
Number-one singles in Scotland
Ultratop 50 Singles (Flanders) number-one singles
UK Singles Chart number-one singles
Barcelona in popular culture
Spanglish songs
2011 songs